69th Golden Reel Awards
March 13, 2022

Dialogue and ADR:
Nightmare Alley

Sound Effects and Foley:
Dune
The 69th Golden Reel Awards, were held on March 13, 2022, by the Motion Picture Sound Editors (M.P.S.E.) to honor the best in sound editing for film, television, computer entertainment and student productions in 2021. The nominations were announced on January 24, 2022, the film Dune led the nominations with three.

Winners and nominees
The winners are listed first and on bold.

Film

Broadcast media

Gaming

Student film

References

External links
 MPSE.org

2021 film awards
2021 in American cinema